Stade is a district (Landkreis) in Lower Saxony, Germany. It has its seat in Stade and is part of the Hamburg Metropolitan Region.

History

The district of Stade was established in 1932 by merging three smaller precursor districts.

Geography

Location 
The district is situated at the southern banks of the Elbe river, between the city of Hamburg and the river's mouth. The western border of the district is the Oste, a narrow tributary of the Elbe. The land between the Oste and the town of Stade is traditionally called Kehdingen. The area to the east of Stade is known as the Altes Land (literally "Old Land"). It is characterised by thousands of fruit trees.

Bordering districts 
It is surrounded by (from the north and clockwise) the Schleswig-Holstein districts Dithmarschen, Steinburg and Pinneberg (all on the other side of the Elbe river), the city-state of Hamburg as well as the Lower Saxony districts Harburg, Rotenburg and Cuxhaven.

Coat of arms

The coat of arms displays:
 a castle, symbolising Stade as the former seat of the Counts of Stade
 the key from the arms of the Archbishopric of Bremen, to which the area once belonged
 a white horse, representing Hanover and Lower Saxony

Towns and municipalities

References

External links

 Official website 

 
Districts of Lower Saxony